= Kenchamallanahalli =

Coordinates: 14°35′N 76°29′E

Kenchamallanahalli is a village in the southern state of Karnataka, India.

== See also ==
- Bellary
- Districts of Karnataka
